Crummey is a surname. Notable people with the surname include:

Andrew Crummey (born 1984), American football guard
Joe Crummey, American radio talk show host
Louise McKinney née Crummey (1868–1931), politician and women's rights activist from Alberta, Canada
Michael Crummey (born 1965), Canadian poet and writer
P. W. Crummey (1891–1960), public figure in Newfoundland

See also
Crummey Nunatak
Crummey trust for the benefit of a minor
Cramme
Grumme